The  is one of several schools of Zen in Japanese Buddhism, in addition to Sōtō and Rinzai.

History
Often termed the third sect of Zen Buddhism in Japan, Ōbaku-shū was established in 1661 by a small faction of masters from China and their Japanese students at Manpuku-ji in Uji, Japan.

Today Manpuku-ji serves as the Ōbaku's head temple, with 420 subtemples spread throughout Japan as of 2006. In addition to their contribution to the culture of Zen in Japan, the Ōbaku also "disseminated many aspects of Ming-period culture" in the country. Many of the monks who came from China were accomplished calligraphers, and Obaku's founder Yinyuan Longqi and two other Ōbaku masters, Mokuan Shōtō and Sokuhi Nyoitsu, became known as the Ōbaku no Sanpitsu (or, the "Three Brushes of Ōbaku"). Author Steven Heine writes, "Areas where the influence of — or the reaction to — Ōbaku left an imprint on Japanese Buddhism is manifold, and its impact even reached the fields of Japanese cultural techniques, such as printing and painting. Chinese medicine and architecture were also introduced, as was the practice of "spirit writing", the latter practiced by Ōbaku monks who were said to communicate with Chen Tuan.

Rooted in the lineage (school) of Linji, and therefore sharing a familial relationship with the Rinzai-shū of Japan, the Ōbaku's approach to practice is today tinged with a hint of Chinese influence. More narrowly, Ōbaku abbots are now all from the Ōtōkan lineage, the same as Rinzai, and thus practices are largely similar, though this was not the case originally. Historically, the Ōbaku-shū has sometimes been referred to as "Nembutsu Zen"—a derogatory characterization intended to describe their use of "Zen and Pure Land practices." Helen J. Baroni writes that today, "With a few notable exceptions, such as the style of sutra chanting (which continues to be done in an approximation of Fujian dialect), Ōbaku temples and monasteries appear very like their Rinzai neighbors." Statistically the smallest school/sect of Zen in modern-day Japan, the Ōbaku is also like the Rinzai-shū in that it is known to be more conservative and intellectually inclined than the Sōtō-shū.

The development of the Ōbaku-shū in Japan began somewhere around 1620, a period when Chinese emigrants were coming to Nagasaki due to a decree by the shogunate allowing Chinese traders to conduct business there. The Chinese traders, in turn, began to request that monks from China come to Nagasaki "to serve the religious needs of their community and build monasteries in the late-Ming style with which they were familiar." The Chinese community was therefore thrilled when the founder of the Ōbaku, a master of the Linji school/sect named Yinyuan Longqi (J. Ingen Ryūki), arrived from China in Nagasaki in 1654 with a small group of his Chinese students. Furthermore, Yinyuan himself was happy to get away from China, which was then amidst a terrible war. Yinyuan was there with the explicit purpose of helping three underdeveloped temples founded by Chinese emigrants grow in the city. These Nagasaki temples were known as the three "temples of good fortune," respectively Kōfuku-ji, Fukusai-ji and Sōfuku-ji. In time many Japanese heard of his teachings and traveled to Nagasaki to see him, while some came to join his community and become students. Having planned to stay in Japan for a short period of time, Yinyuan was persuaded by a group of his Japanese students to remain in Japan; this group secured him governmental permission to relocate to Kyoto, where his student Ryūkai Shōsen wished he would then become abbot of the Rinzai temple Myoshin-ji. Authorities within the Rinzai organization were not keen on this idea, due primarily to a disagreement within the congregation as to whether or not Yinyuan presented a take on Zen that was too distinctly Chinese for Japanese tastes. As a consequence, Yinyuan began construction of the modern day head temple of the Ōbaku known as Ōbaku-san Manpuku-ji in 1661 in Uji of Kyoto prefecture (Ōbaku-san being the mountain name). This marks the emergence of the Ōbaku school/sect of Zen Buddhism in Japan.

Construction was completed in 1669, the architecture done in the Chinese Ming dynasty style. By authorization of the local bakufu leaders (i.e. Tokugawa Tsunayoshi), the Ōbaku-shu emerged to help revitalize Rinzai practice in Japan. The practice at Manpuku-ji was different from that in other Rinzai temples and monasteries of Japan during this period, being much more Chinese in its approach. Yinyuan brought with him aspects of esoteric Buddhism and Pure Land Buddhism. As Heinrich Dumoulin puts it, "For Zen practice in general, seated meditation and the practice of kōan are central, while cultic ceremony is of secondary importance. Insofar as the Ōbaku belonged to the Rinzai tradition, zazen and kōan practice were made part of daily life, but ritual was also accorded a place of considerable importance." Furthermore, Ōbaku monasteries and temples came to be governed by a doctrine known as Ōbaku shingi, which both imported Chinese practices such as the recitation (dharani) of nembutsu and "sought to preserve the Chinese character of the group." The Ōbaku also chanted sutras derived from the Pure Land Buddhist sect set to Chinese music.

After Yinyuan's retirement in 1664 and death in 1673, other monks who had come to Japan around the same time as he helped to carry on the tradition of practice at Manpuku-ji. The foremost of his disciples was Mokuan Shōtō, who became 2nd abbot of Manpuku-ji in 1664. During its formative years, Manpuku-ji was very popular in Japan with many adherents coming to the temple for instruction. According to the book Latter Days of the Law, "For the next century, Manpuku-ji was headed by Chinese immigrant monks, and they sent their Japanese followers to found other temples. Ōbaku Zen quickly spread through the country." At least one abbot of Manpuku-ji during this period of early Ōbaku history proved to be controversial. His name was Tu-chan Hsing-jung (Dokutan Shōtei), and he served as 4th abbot of Manpuku-ji. Critics charge that he took his emphasis on nembutsu recitation at Manpuku-ji too far, and he is today derisively nicknamed "Nembutsu Dokutan".

Perhaps the most important Ōbaku practitioner besides Yinyuan Longqi was Tetsugen Dōkō, a Japanese man who lived from 1630 to 1682. Tetsugen is remembered for having transcribed the entire Ming period Chinese Tripitaka to woodblocks—known as the Tetsugen-ban or Ōbaku-ban (ban meaning edition). Raised as part of the Jōdo Shinshū of Japan, Tetsugen first met Yinyuan in 1655 at Kōfuku-ji in Nagasaki and eventually came to join the Ōbaku. The first Japanese abbot of Manpuku-ji assumed leadership of the Ōbaku in 1740, a man by the name of Ryūtō Gentō. From 1786 on through to the modern-day, the Ōbaku has been run and controlled by exclusively Japanese leadership.

Characteristics

Monastic practices of the Ōbaku-shū were once largely informed by the Ōbaku shingi (or, Ōbaku codes), composed in 1672 with ten sections outlining the practice regimen at Manpuku-ji. Steven Heine writes that, "The text reflected a few evolutionary changes that had taken place in Chinese monasteries since the Yuan, but it was squarely in the tradition of classical rules of purity such as the Chanyuan qingui and Chixiu baizhang qingqui." The Rinzai branch Myōshin-ji authored their own set of monastic regulations (penned by Mujaku Dōchū) in response to this later in 1685. To be sure, Myoshinji was worried about losing students to the Ōbaku, who were growing in popularity. The Ōbaku's "emphasis on the precepts and the strict observance of monastic regulations embodied in Ōbaku shingi seem to have stimulated and encouraged certain Japanese masters of similar bent. In the Sōtō sect, for example, the Chinese teachers influenced the monastic codes of reformers like Gesshū Sōko and Manzan Dōhaku who had studied under Ōbaku masters."

The Ōbaku-shū emphasized the taking of various precepts and also observed the Vinaya of the Dharmaguptaka tradition as well as sutra translation. But perhaps most obvious to the Japanese was their use of nembutsu and also their use of the "nembutsu kōan" which entailed the practice of reciting the name of Amitabha while holding in one's mind the kōan, "Who is reciting?" While foreign to the Japanese (despite this "dual practice" being introduced in Japan as early as the late 13th century), this was very common in Ming period Ch'an, where there was no sectarian divide between Pure Land Buddhists and Ch'an practitioners. Author Steven Heine writes:

As a result of their approach, many Rinzai and Sōtō masters undertook reforming and revitalizing their own monastic institutions, such as Rinzai master Ungo Kiyō who even began implementing the use of nembutsu into his training regimen at Zuigan-ji. T. Griffith Foulk writes:

Specifically, starting under the leadership of chief abbot Ryochu Nyoryu 良忠如隆 (1793–1868), Zen practice largely became the same as Rinzai practice, but monastic and cultural differences remain. Additionally, Buddhist sutras in the Ōbaku-shū continue today to be chanted in Chinese.

Culture 
This is similar to usual shōjin ryōri, but with more Chinese influence. It was introduced by Yinyuan and his group, and served at the main temple of Manpuku-ji, along with various subtemples such as Kanga-an.

The Ōbaku school also introduced loose-leaf tea to Japan. This would later produce a variant of the Japanese tea ceremony which uses sencha leaf tea, rather than the more usual matcha powdered tea.

Notable temples

Head temple
Manpuku-ji – Construction began in 1661 and concluded in 1669. Located in Kyoto, Manpuku-ji serves as the head temple of the Ōbaku school. It provides a "rare example" of a temple built in a purely Chinese Ming period architectural style in Japan.

Subtemples
Fukusai-ji – Founded in 1628 in Nagasaki and later destroyed in 1945, Fukusai-ji has since been reconstructed in the shape of a turtle with an 18-metre high aluminum alloy statue of Kannon, the Bodhisattva of compassion. The interior is famous for the 25-metre Foucault Pendulum which swings over the remains of 16,500 Japanese killed during World War II.
Fukugon-ji (Yanagawa)
Fukuju-ji (Kitakyushu)
Kōfuku-ji (Nagasaki)
Ryūshin-ji
Shōhō-ji (Gifu)
Sōfuku-ji (Nagasaki)
Toko-ji
Zuishō-ji

See also

Buddhism in Japan
Mount Huangbo
Religion in Japan
Rinzai
Sōtō

Notes

References

Further reading
 Addiss, Stephen (1978). Obaku:  Zen Painting and Calligraphy, Helen Foresman Spencer Museum of Art, The University of Kansas, Lawrence, Kansas
 Linhartová, Vĕra (2002). La culture Ōbaku et le renouveau de l'art bouddhique au Japon à l'époque des Tokugawa, Arts asiatiques  57, 114-136
 Moss, Paul et al. (2014). "Eat this and Drink Some Tea:"  Chinese and Japanese Calligraphy and Painting of the Obaku School. London: Sydney L. Moss Gallery

External links
 Mampukuji Official Website
Joint Council for Japanese Rinzai and Obaku Zen

Zen sects
 Obaku
1661 establishments in Japan